Herberts Dāboliņš (born 21 August 1908, date of death unknown) was a Latvian cross-country skier. He competed in the men's 18 kilometre event at the 1936 Winter Olympics.

References

1908 births
Year of death missing
Latvian male cross-country skiers
Olympic cross-country skiers of Latvia
Cross-country skiers at the 1936 Winter Olympics
People from Sigulda Municipality